"Get Involved" is a song by Raphael Saadiq and Q-Tip, released on March 23, 1999, from the soundtrack The PJs: Music from & Inspired by the Hit Television Series. Produced by the duo, the song contains elements of "I'll Always Love My Mama" by The Intruders.

Track listing

12" single
A-side
 "Get Involved" (Album Version)
 "Get Involved" (Instrumental)

B-side
 "Get Involved" (DJ Thomilla's Benztown RMX [Extended Version])
 "Get Involved" (DJ Thomilla's Benztown RMX [Edit])

Charts

References 

1998 songs
1999 singles
Hollywood Records singles
Q-Tip (musician) songs
Raphael Saadiq songs
Song recordings produced by Q-Tip (musician)
Song recordings produced by Raphael Saadiq
Songs written by Gene McFadden
Songs written by Kenny Gamble
Songs written by Leon Huff
Songs written by Q-Tip (musician)
Songs written by Raphael Saadiq